Everything in 3 Parts is the first full-length album by Canadian pop-rock band The Golden Dogs. This breakthrough album features their up-beat, debut single "Can't Get Your Face Out Of My Head" and the energy-charged, follow-up single "Yeah!" Also the song "Birdsong" was featured on a Zellers commercial in 2006. The song "Yeah" was also used in a Budweiser commercial in 2008.

Track listing
All songs written and arranged by Dave Azzolini.
"Birdsong"
"Faster"
"Can't Get Your Face Out Of My Head"
"Don't Make A Sound"
"I Don't Sleep"
"Elevator Man"
"Bastards"
"Yeah!"
"Anniversary Waltz"
"Balloons"
"Driving In The Rain"
"Big Boy And The Masters Of The Universe"

Personnel
Dave Azzolini - Vocls, guitar, bass, drums
Jessica Grassia - Backing vocals, keyboards, percussion
Michael W. Chambers - Guitar, backing vocals, keyboards, bass
Adam Warner - Drums
Alfons Fear - Trumpet
Micah Goldstein - Bass, backing vocals
Beau Stocker - Drums

2004 albums
The Golden Dogs albums